The Broxbourne Council election, 1992 was held to elect council members of the Broxbourne Borough Council, the local government authority of the borough of Broxbourne, Hertfordshire, England.

Composition of expiring seats before election

Election results

Results summary 

An election was held in 14 wards on 7 May 1992.

The Conservative Party gained a seat from the Labour Party in Rye Park Ward

The new political balance of the Council following this election was:

Conservative 36 seats
Labour 4 seats
Liberal Democrats 2 Seats

Ward results

References

1992
1992 English local elections
1990s in Hertfordshire